Waynesville Main Street Historic District is a national historic district located at Waynesville, Haywood County, North Carolina.  It includes 35 contributing buildings in the central business district of Waynesville.   It includes notable examples of Classical Revival style architecture, including the separately listed Waynesville Municipal Building, Citizens Bank and Trust Company Building, Former, Gateway Club, and Haywood County Courthouse.  Other notable buildings include Sherrill's Studio (1942), Bank and Library building (1905), and Stringfield Medical Building (c. 1905).

It was listed on the National Register of Historic Places in 2005.

References

Commercial buildings on the National Register of Historic Places in North Carolina
Historic districts on the National Register of Historic Places in North Carolina
Buildings designated early commercial in the National Register of Historic Places
Neoclassical architecture in North Carolina
Geography of Haywood County, North Carolina
National Register of Historic Places in Haywood County, North Carolina
Waynesville, North Carolina